Lagos State University, also known as LASU, is located in Ojo, with sub-campuses at Ikeja and Epe both towns in Lagos State, Nigeria. The university was established in 1983 by the enabling law of Lagos State, for the advancement of learning and establishment of academic excellence; its motto being For Truth and Service. The university caters for over 35,000 students. The University was established during the Administration of Late Lateef Kayode Jakande. The university offers diploma, degree and post graduate programmes, including an MBA programme. LASU was ranked among the top 600 universities in the world by in the Times Higher Education World University Rankings for 2020. On 23 June, 2021 LASU emerged as the best young university in Nigeria having been below the age of 50 years to be added. Times Higher Education ranked the Lagos State University as the second best university in Nigeria on the 2 September 2020, and was the only state university included in the rankings for 2022. The university has attracted international funding, including for the establishment of a World Bank Group Africa Centre for Excellence on Science, Technology, Engineering and Mathematics. 

The university has three major campuses, at Ojo, Ikeja and Epe.

History
The university was conceived as a multi-campus and non-residential University. It operates a multi-campus system with four fully owned campuses having its main campus at Ojo (along the Badagry Expressway) and other campuses at Epe (where the Faculty of Engineering and the School of Agriculture are located), Ikeja (where the College of Medicine is situated in at Lasuth).

A 300 seat theatre hall is under construction at the school's main campus in Ojo by the Awori Welfare Association of Nigeria (AWAN). The project site is opposite the Babatunde Raji Fashola Senate House. It is flanked by a new library building, which is still under construction, and the existing student affairs building. When finished, the building will serve as a lecture hall for students with offices and secretariat.

The university began with three faculties: Commerce and Business Administration, Law and Medicine. The Faculty of Commerce and Business Administration was changed to the Faculty of Business and Social Studies at its first meeting the board. The faculties of Arts, Education, Engineering and Science were added later.

Epe campus
The Epe campus is located on the north side of the Lekki Lagoon and houses the Faculty of Engineering, School of Agriculture, school of pre-degree studies and also diploma programs. The Epe campus is fully residential, and was developed because the Ojo campus could not accommodate the Faculty of Engineering as population became larger. The campus was converted from military barracks that were released by the persuasion of the then military governor in the regime of Olusegun Obasanjo.
The campus is home for the school's pre-degree studies and diploma programs, and is the largest property belonging to the school, larger than the main campus.

The Epe campus has an information commons that could be referred to as the library. The modern building was built and commissioned in the later part of 2008 by the then Chairman of the Governing Council, Mr Kekere-Ekun (OFR). It has a sitting capacity of 400 in its reading area with seating for 100 in the free wifi-connected E-library section.
The Epe library offers information services to the  students and staff of the university and works in collaboration with the faculty to deliver best teaching, learning and research experience that is comparable to other higher learning institutions in the country. The library's administrative head on the campus is known as the Head of Library, who takes directives from the University Librarian at the Main Campus, Ojo. 

Four departments of Faculty of Engineering are based at the Epe campus: Mechanical Engineering, Electronics and Computer Engineering, Chemical Engineering, Aeronautical and Astronautical Engineering, Civil Engineering, and Industrial and system Engineering, which was added in 2021.

The Epe campus is being governed by a Head of Campus (H.O.C.) who has a similar role to a vice-chancellor, and supervises academic and non-academic activities on the campus. The School of Agriculture has its Dean as well as the Faculty of Engineering. The school is generally administered by the Vice-Chancellor who has his seat at the main campus, Ojo. The campus produces a candidate for the post of Vice president, Welfare director, and Assistant General Secretary in its student union Government representing the University campus at the main campus; Ojo. The current Head Of Campus for the EPE campus is Professor R.O. Okuneye who started his tenure in the year 2021. The campus also runs postgraduate programs across the three old engineering departments namely: Mechanical Engineering, Electronics and Computer Engineering, Chemical Engineering. For an academically conducive environment, the campus does not rely on the public power grid but owns an alternative power source. The campus generator is powered for both the student's hostels, lecture rooms and staff quarters. A few years back, the Army arrived and now occupy some parts of the University structures.

Programme
Areas of education and research offered by the Institution are summarized in the table below:

The two stream system was introduced in 2019 by Vice Chancellor Prof. Olanrewaju Fagbohun, who said that the innovation would to provide handicraft knowledge to students, would add value to their knowledge base and would encourage self-employment.

Campus radio station
The campus radio station LASU FM is located on the university's main Ojo campus. It was founded in 2016.

Vice Chancellor 
Ibiyemi Olatunji-Bello is the ninth substantive vice-chancellor of the Lagos State University (LASU), she assumed duty on Wednesday, 22 September 2021.

Prof. Olatunji-Bello was appointed the 9th Substantive Vice-Chancellor of the Lagos State University on 16 September 2021 succeeding Prof. Olanrewaju Fagbohun whose tenure ended on 11 January 2021.

The Lagos State University (LASU) Ojo has started its work-study program with a group of ten students studying various courses as a pilot set.The plan is one of the administration's six-cardinal priorities, according to Prof Ibiyemi Olatunji-Bello, the university's current Vice-Chancellor.

Former Vice Chancellors

Professor Folabi Olumide (Pioneer Vice Chancellor)†
Professor (Mrs.) Jadesola Akande†
Professor Enitan Bababunmi†
Professor Fatiu Ademola Akesode†
Professor Abisogun Leigh
Professor Abdul Lateef A. Hussein†
Professor John Obafunwa
Professor Olanrewaju Fagbohun

Notable alumni

 

Oluranti Adebule, former Deputy governor Lagos State.
Brymo, singer and songwriter.
Sound Sultan, singer and songwriter(1976-2021)
Chioma Chukwuka, musician, actress
Liz Da-Silva, actress
Yinka Durosinmi, former Chairman of Ojo local government
Oba Saheed Ademola Elegushi, traditional ruler
Jennifer Eliogu, actress. 
Desmond Elliot, actor, producer and politician.
Tara Fela-Durotoye, celebrity make-up artist
Annie Macaulay-Idibia, actress
Mudashiru Obasa, Speaker of the Lagos State House of Assembly.
Tajudeen Obasa, current member of the National Assembly
Tunde Obe
Tunji Disu, Police officer
Angela Okorie, actress
Yinka Olukunga, actress
Cossy Orjiakor, actress, singer, socialite
Ruggedman, rapper
Rukky Sanda, actress 
Dolly Unachukwu, actress 
Farida Waziri, former EFCC chairman
Wizkid, singer and songwriter
Sodiq Abubakar Yusuf, singer
Ada Ogochukwu Ehi, singer.
Angela Okorie, Nigerian actress
Eniola Badmus, Actress.
OlaDotun Ojuolape Kayode, media personality.
Tope Oshin, Nigerian television and film director.
Olaide Olaogun, Nigerian film actress and model.
Mary Ikoku, Nigerian development consultant.

Notable faculty
 

Fatiu Ademola Akesode
Charles Ayo
Robert Ajayi Boroffice
Sola Fosudo
Yemi Osinbajo

Achievements 
Lagos State University was once  the 2nd best University in Nigeria in the 2021 world University ranking. It ranks amongst 501st to 600th Universities on the World ranking 2021 and 801st to 1000th on the impact rankings 2021

Gallery

References

External links

Universities and colleges in Nigeria
Educational institutions established in 1983
1983 establishments in Nigeria
Education in Lagos State
Public universities in Nigeria
Universities and colleges in Lagos